Francis Eric Bee (23 January 1927 – 2010) was an English professional footballer who played as an inside forward for Sunderland.

References

1927 births
2010 deaths
Footballers from Nottingham
English footballers
Association football inside forwards
Nottingham Forest F.C. players
Sunderland A.F.C. players
Blackburn Rovers F.C. players
English Football League players